SLNS Gajabahu (P626) is an Advanced Offshore Patrol Vessel of the Sri Lanka Navy. The ship is the second ship named after King Gajabahu I, the warrior king of the medieval Sri Lankan Kingdom of Anuradhapura.

Formerly, it was USCGC Sherman (WHEC-720) a United States Coast Guard Hamilton-class high endurance cutter named for John Sherman, the 32nd United States Secretary of the Treasury and author of the Sherman Antitrust Act.

United States Coast Guard

CGC Shermans keel was laid on January 25, 1967 at Avondale Shipyards in New Orleans, Louisiana. She was launched on September 3, 1968.

CGC Sherman was originally homeported in Boston, Massachusetts where her primary mission was ocean station patrol in the North Atlantic.

In 1970, Sherman was assigned to Coast Guard Squadron Three in Vietnam. Her tasking during the conflict was primarily in support of Operation Market Time, which involved sorting through hundreds of small vessels off the Vietnamese coast in search of enemy weapons smugglers. Shermans crew inspected some 900 vessels during her 10-month tour in Southeast Asia. The old 5" gun (now replaced by a 76mm mount) answered 152 calls for naval gunfire support, including a running fight on the night of 21 November 1970 which resulted in sinking the North Vietnamese armed freighter SL-3, which was carrying tons of enemy munitions.

In 1971, Sherman returned to Boston. With satellite technology reducing the need for ocean station patrols and amid concern of the rising American drug problem, the emphasis shifted to drug interdiction. In October 1976, Sherman seized the 275-foot Panamanian freighter Don Emilio and confiscated 82 tons of marijuana, the largest drug seizure in history at the time. Responding to a need for greater operational resources in the Pacific, Sherman was transferred to her next homeport in Alameda, California in May 1979. Shermans primary missions shifted to Alaskan Patrols (ALPAT) involving fisheries law enforcement (LE), drug interdiction, search and rescue (SAR), and military readiness in the Bering Sea and Gulf of Alaska. Sherman was decommissioned from May 1986 until July 1989 to complete a three-year Fleet Renovation and Modernization (FRAM) project at Todd Shipyard in Seattle, Washington. The project upgraded Shermans weapons, communications, aviation and other operating systems and completely renovated crew living and berthing spaces. Sherman completed ready-for-sea trials in July 1990 and once again commenced operational missions in the Pacific.

In July 2001, Sherman became the first Coast Guard cutter to circumnavigate the world, after conducting U.N. sanctions enforcement duty in the Persian Gulf and goodwill projects in Madagascar, South Africa, and Cape Verde.

Sherman was involved in search and rescue efforts following the sinking of F/V Big Valley near Saint Paul Island, Alaska, on January 15, 2005.

CGC Sherman appeared in the 2005 film Yours Mine & Ours.

In May 2006, the cutter participated with a U.S. Navy task group during a five-month deployment to Singapore, Thailand, Indonesia, Malaysia, Brunei and the Philippines. In March 2007, Sherman received worldwide attention when her boarding team discovered more than 17 metric tons of cocaine aboard the Panamanian freighter Gatun, a record seizure in the Eastern Pacific. Sherman was awarded the Golden Eagle award by the White House for combined interdiction successes during 2007.

In May 2011, Sherman was transferred to San Diego, California. Sherman continued her operations by accomplishing three drug interdiction deployments in the Eastern Pacific, a winter Alaskan patrol in the Bering Sea to enforce U.S. fisheries regulations and to provide search-and-rescue support during the Alaskan red king crab harvest, and by earning the Pacific Area Operational Readiness Award.

In May 2015, Sherman transferred her homeport to Honolulu, Hawaii.

After a final patrol in the Bering Sea, Sherman returned to Honolulu on January 23, 2018 to await decommissioning on March 29, 2018. Two new National Security Cutters will replace Sherman and the previously-retired  in Honolulu.

Sri Lanka Navy 

On 27 August 2018, at Honolulu, the ex-Sherman was transferred to the Sri Lanka Navy. Ex-Sherman was recommissioned 6 June 2019 as SLNS Gajabahu (P626). The ship is the second ship named after King Gajabahu I, the warrior king of the medieval Sri Lankan Kingdom of Anuradhapura. The ship retained its Otobreda 76 mm gun and MK 92 Fire Control System, while the Phalanx CIWS was removed and was replaced with a rear mounted dual 23mm cannon.

During the 2022 Sri Lankan protests, SLNS Gajabahu evacuated President Gotabaya Rajapaksa and his wife from Colombo, hours before the President's House was stormed and occupied by thousands of protesters on 9 July. Departing from the Colombo harbour and sailed within Sri Lankan territorial waters allowing President Rajapaksa to maintain communications while being safely out of reach of the protesters. President Rajapaksa left the island a few days later on the morning of 13 July on an Antonov An-32 military transport aircraft of the Sri Lanka Air Force to Maldives.

See also
SLNS Gajabahu
SLNS Vijayabahu (P627)
SLNS Parakramabahu (P625)

References

External links

 
 

Ships of the United States Coast Guard
Hamilton-class cutters
1968 ships
Hamilton-class cutters of the Sri Lanka Navy
Ships built in Bridge City, Louisiana